Sant Hipòlit de Voltregà is a municipality in the comarca of Osona, Catalonia, Spain. It is surrounded by the municipality Les Masies de Voltregà.

Sport
The city has a roller hockey team Club Patí Voltregà, one of the most important in Spain, and dispute the main League OK Liga.

References

 Panareda Clopés, Josep Maria; Rios Calvet, Jaume; Rabella Vives, Josep Maria (1989). Guia de Catalunya, Barcelona: Caixa de Catalunya.  (Spanish).  (Catalan).

External links
 Government data pages 

Municipalities in Osona